Majid is a 2010 Moroccan film written and directed by Nassim Abassi, starring Brahim Al Bakali and Lotfi Sabir. The film premiered at the Leighton House Museum with the Mena Film Festival.

Plot

The main character, a ten-year-old Moroccan orphan named Majid, has recently moved to Mohammedia with his brother. His brother is an appealing and careless drunk. Majid makes very little money on the streets selling books, and lives a very simple and disheartening life. From the start of the film, Majid is having reoccurring nightmares and soon realizes that he cannot remember his deceased parents' (who had died in a fire) faces anymore. He also realizes that he has no photographs of his parents, except for a ruined family photograph, in which his parents' heads are burnt away from the photo due to the fire. He meets a new street-smart friend named Larbi, who helps him on the journey to find a photograph of his parents. This search leads them to the big city of Casablanca where they come face to face with many dangerous events and become part of a moving adventure.

Cast

 Brahim Al Bakali as Majid
 Lotfi Sabir as Larbi
 Wassime Zidi	
 Moulay Abdellah Lamrani
 Abderrahim Tounsi
 Mohammed Ben Brahim
 Aïcha Mahmah
 Hicham Ibrahimi
 Mostafa El Houari
 Aziz Hattab
 Youssef Karte
 Brahim Khai
 Mohamed Harraga
 Yassine Sekkal
 Fayçal Azizi

Inspiration

Nassim Abassi was brought up in Morocco, and had many inspirations for the film Majid. Abassi had stated:

Reception

The film was greatly received by many critics. Raphael Cormack had written in the Arab Review that the film is "both genuinely funny and genuinely moving". The film had also won numerous awards like in Morocco's National Film Festival, Rotterdam Arab Film Festival and many more.

References

External links
 

Moroccan drama films
2010 films